"Free Me" is the sixth single by the Liverpool britpop band Cast, fronted by ex La's bassist John Power.

Formats and track listings
CD single (1)
 "Free Me"
 "Come on Everybody"
 "Canter"
 "Free Me" (acoustic)

CD single (2)
 "Free Me"
 "Release My Soul"
 "Dancing on the Flames"

7" single
 "Free Me"
 "Come on Everybody"

Personnel
Cast
 John Power – vocals, guitar
 Peter Wilkinson – backing vocals, bass
 Liam "Skin" Tyson – guitar
 Keith O'Neill – drums

Production
 John Leckie – producer
 Mark "Spike" Stent – mixing

Chart performance

References

1997 singles
Cast (band) songs
Songs written by John Power (musician)
Song recordings produced by John Leckie
Polydor Records singles